Donald Alain Joseph Dufresne (born April 10, 1967) is a Canadian former professional ice hockey defenceman.

Biography
Dufresne was born in Quebec City, Quebec. As a youth, he played in the 1980 Quebec International Pee-Wee Hockey Tournament with a minor ice hockey team from Rimouski.

Dufresne started his National Hockey League career with the Montreal Canadiens in 1989.  He would also play for the Tampa Bay Lightning, Los Angeles Kings, St. Louis Blues, and Edmonton Oilers.  He would win a Stanley Cup with the 1993 Canadiens.

Dufresne was later an assistant coach and assistant general manager of the Rimouski Oceanic in the Quebec Major Junior Hockey League, and the assistant coach of the Hamilton Bulldogs, in the American Hockey League.

Career statistics

References

External links

1967 births
Living people
Canadian ice hockey defencemen
Edmonton Oilers players
Fredericton Canadiens players
French Quebecers
Ice hockey people from Quebec City
Longueuil Chevaliers players
Los Angeles Kings players
Montreal Canadiens coaches
Montreal Canadiens draft picks
Montreal Canadiens players
Quebec Rafales players
Rimouski Océanic coaches
Sherbrooke Canadiens players
St. Louis Blues players
Stanley Cup champions
Tampa Bay Lightning players
Trois-Rivières Draveurs players
Worcester IceCats players
Canadian ice hockey coaches